The Department of Social Security (DSS) was a governmental agency in the United Kingdom from 1988 to 2001. The old abbreviation is still often used informally. Advertisements for rented accommodation used to describe prospective tenants who would be paying their rent by means of Housing Benefit, or the "Housing Element" of Universal Credit, as "DSS" tenants. However, because of many changes within the benefit system, which is managed by the Department for Work and Pensions, the "DSS" tenants phrase has become outdated and is rarely used.

History

After the Fowler report, the Department of Health and Social Security separated during 1988 to form two departments, one of which was the DSS. During 2001, the department was largely replaced by the Department for Work and Pensions, with the other responsibilities of the department assumed by the Treasury and the Ministry for Defence.

Beginning in 1989, the Department of Social Security was subdivided into six executive agencies - firstly into the Resettlement agency, in 1990 ITSA (Information Technology Services Agency), the Benefits Agency and Contributions Agency in 1991, the Child Support Agency in 1993 and the War Pensions Agency in 1994.

As part of the UK government's spending review (March 1998), a paper New Ambitions for our Country: A New Contract for Welfare (1998) announced plans to increase efficiency ("streamline") in the administration of benefits from policy of social welfare, plans subsequently adopted as the "single gateway to benefits". The Welfare Reform and Pensions Act 1999 brought reforms to the DSS guided by the principle of "work for those that can and security for those that cannot".

References

Social affairs ministries
Social Security
1988 establishments in the United Kingdom
2001 disestablishments in the United Kingdom
Leeds